Bay Area Houston Ballet and Theatre is a non-profit performance theater group located in the Bay Area of Greater Houston in the United States. The group offers performances in genres ranging from ballet to American musicals.

The group's home is the Feijoo Ballet School in Dickinson (in the Clear Lake Area near Houston), whose faculty résumés include the Houston Ballet, the Joffrey Ballet, and American Ballet Theatre, and Broadway. Performances are held at Bayou Theater on the campus of the University of Houston–Clear Lake.

The company was created to support the "pre-professional and aspiring professional dancer." It is not affiliated with the Houston Ballet.

Notes

External links

 Bay Area Houston Ballet & Theatre

Ballet companies in the United States
Theatre companies in Houston
Greater Houston
Galveston Bay Area
Dance in Texas
Non-profit organizations based in Texas